The Zenoah G-50 is a twin-cylinder, horizontally opposed, two stroke, carburetted aircraft engine, designed for use on ultralight aircraft.

Development
The Zenoah G-50 is equipped with single capacitor discharge ignition and dual Mikuni slide-type carburetors. It is equipped with a recoil starter system or optionally electric start and a 2.1 or 2.6:1 belt reduction drive.

The engine runs on a mixture of unleaded auto fuel and oil.

Producing  at 5800 rpm, the G-50 competed in the early 1980s ultralight powerplant market against the similar Rotax 447. Production of the engine was completed in the late 1980s and today only used engines and parts are available.

Variants
G50C
Twin-cylinder, horizontally opposed, two stroke, dual-carburetor, fan cooled aircraft engine.
G50D
Twin-cylinder, horizontally opposed, two stroke, dual-carburetor, free air cooled aircraft engine.
G50DFW
Twin-cylinder, horizontally opposed, two stroke, dual-carburetor, free air cooled aircraft engine, configured for firewall mounting, recoil starting not available.

Applications
AmeriPlanes Mitchell Wing T-10
Eagles Wing Scout
Goodwin Buckshot
TEAM 1200Z Z-MAX
TEAM 1300Z Z-MAX
NWT Spruce Coupe
Tennessee Propellers Scout

Specifications (G-50C)

References

Air-cooled aircraft piston engines
Two-stroke aircraft piston engines